The Alpine Lakes Wilderness is a large wilderness area in the North Cascades mountain range, located in northern Washington state, the Northwestern United States. Lakes in the Alpine Lakes Wilderness are protected within the Wenatchee National Forest or Mount Baker-Snoqualmie National Forest. A list of notable lakes in the Alpine Lakes Wilderness is shown, below.

Lakes

See also

List of peaks in the Alpine Lakes Wilderness
Ecology of the North Cascades
Geography of the North Cascades
List of waterfalls of Washington

North Cascades of Washington (state)
Lists of landforms of Washington (state)
Lists of lakes of the United States
Wenatchee National Forest
Mount Baker-Snoqualmie National Forest